Jagat Prasad Yadav is a Nepalese politician. He is a member of Provincial Assembly of Madhesh Province from CPN (Maoist Centre). Yadav is a resident of Golbazar, Siraha.

References

Living people
1977 births
Madhesi people
21st-century Nepalese politicians
Members of the Provincial Assembly of Madhesh Province
Communist Party of Nepal (Maoist Centre) politicians